Ben Matheson may refer to:

Ben Matheson, character in Revolution (TV series)
Ben Matheson, character in Wichita Town